The Embraer Lineage 1000 is a variant of the Embraer 190 regional jet airliner, launched as a private jet on May 2, 2006.  Manufactured by the Brazilian aerospace firm Embraer, the Lineage is advertised as an "ultra-large" business jet with comfortable seating for 19.

Design

The Lineage 1000 is based on the Embraer 190 airliner, with added fuel tanks in the lower deck cargo hold space, nearly doubling the jet's range. It boasts a lavish interior, divided into up to five sections including an optional bedroom, a washroom with running water, and a walk-in cargo area at the rear. Its fuselage cross-section is larger than similarly priced business jets like the $50.4M Global 5000, $53.8M Falcon 7X or $54.5M Gulfstream G600, but smaller than other airliner conversions; the Boeing 737-700 based BBJ1 costing $71.4M or Airbus A319 based ACJ319 costing $87.0M.

Development
The Lineage 1000 received its certification from Brazil's ANAC and from EASA in December 2008.  It was certified by the USA Federal Aviation Administration on 7 January 2009. The first Lineage 1000 was delivered to Aamer Abdul Jalil Al Fahim on May 7, 2009.

In October 2013, Embraer introduced the Lineage 1000E, which delivers greater range - 4,600 nm (8,519 km). In addition, the new Lineage 1000E features new in-flight entertainment and cockpit options. In 2019, its unit cost was US$ 49.9 million. In August 2020 Embraer announced that it was stopping sales of the Lineage 1000.

On 6 October 2020, the Pakistan Navy announced the selection of the Lineage 1000 to replace its P-3C Orion in the maritime patrol role, with 10 converted commercial jets, the first of which has been ordered. It was unclear whether the aircraft is being acquired directly from the manufacturer or another party. In-service aircraft may not be available due to low production numbers, while existing operators may be selling their aircraft due to COVID restrictions on air travel.

Operators

Civil operators
 Al Jaber Aviation 
 AirX Charter
 Falcon Aviation Services
 Royal Jet
Air Hamburg
Conviasa
Flex Flight International

Military and government operators
   
 Brazilian Air Force - 2 units used as secondary presidential aircraft

 Pakistan Navy - 10 units ordered and 1 delivered in 2020 to replace their old P-3 Orion Aircraft

Aircraft deliveries

Specifications (Lineage 1000)

See also

References

External links

 Embraer Lineage 1000 homepage

2000s Brazilian business aircraft
Embraer aircraft
Twinjets
Aircraft first flown in 2007
Low-wing aircraft